Lupo (F 564) was the lead ship of the Lupo-class frigate of the Italian Navy. She was sold to Peruvian Navy in the 2000s.

Pelacios (FM-56) is one of eight Carvajal-class frigates of the Peruvian Navy.

Construction and career

Italian service

The ship initially built for the Italian Navy and was named Lupo with a pennant of F 564. The ship was laid down on 11 October 1974, was launched on 19 July 1976 by the shipyard Riva Trigoso and commissioned in the Italian Navy on 12 September 1977.

In 2003, Lupo was decommissioned and transferred to the Navy of Peru.

Peruvian service

The Peruvian flag first flew over the ship on 3 November 2004 in La Spezia, Italy while it was being outfitted for Peruvian usage.

For its commissioning process, Palacios sailed from the port of La Spezia in the Mediterranean Sea, across the Atlantic Ocean and into the Pacific Ocean via the Panama Canal, and south to its base in Callao.

References

External links
 Lupo (F 564) Marina Militare website

Frigates of the Cold War

Carvajal-class frigates
1976 ships
Ships built by Fincantieri
Ships built in Italy